Atomotricha lewisi is a moth in the family Oecophoridae first described by Alfred Philpott in 1927. It is endemic to New Zealand.

References

Moths described in 1927
Oecophoridae
Moths of New Zealand
Endemic fauna of New Zealand
Taxa named by Alfred Philpott
Endemic moths of New Zealand